Bengali grammar ( Bangla Bækôrôn) is the study of the morphology and syntax of Bengali, an Indo-European language spoken in the Indian subcontinent. Given that Bengali has two forms, চলিত ভাষা (cholito bhasha) and সাধু ভাষা (shadhu bhasha), it is important to note that the grammar discussed below applies fully only to the চলিত (cholito) form. Shadhu bhasha is generally considered outdated and no longer used either in writing or in normal conversation. Although Bengali is typically written in the Bengali script, a Romanization scheme is also used here to suggest the pronunciation.

Pronouns

Personal pronouns 
Bengali personal pronouns are somewhat similar to English pronouns, having different words for first, second, and third person, and also for singular and plural (unlike for verbs, below). Bengali pronouns, unlike their English counterparts, do not differentiate for gender; that is, the same pronoun may be used for "he" or "she". However, Bengali has different third-person pronouns for proximity. The first are used for someone who is nearby, and the second are for those who are a little further away. The third are usually for those who are not present. In addition, each of the second- and third-person pronouns have different forms for the familiar and polite forms; the second person also has a "very familiar" form (sometimes called "despective"). It may be noted that the "very familiar" form is used when addressing particularly close friends or family as well as for addressing subordinates, or in abusive language. In the following tables, the abbreviations used are as follows: VF=very familiar, F=familiar, and P=polite (honor); H=here, T=there, E=elsewhere (proximity), and I=inanimate.

The nominative case is used for pronouns that are the subject of the sentence, such as "I already did that" or "Will you please stop making that noise?" 

The objective case is used for pronouns serving as the direct or indirect objects, such as "I told him to wash the dishes" or "The teacher gave me the homework assignment". The inanimate pronouns remain the same in the objective case.

The possessive case is used to show possession, such as "Where is your coat?" or "Let's go to our house". In addition, sentences such as "I have a book" (আমার একটি বই আছে) or "I need money" (আমার টাকা দরকার) also use the possessive (the literal translation of the Bengali versions of these sentences would be "There is my book" and "There is my need for money" respectively).

Indefinite and negative pronouns 
Bengali has no negative pronouns (such as no one, nothing, none). These are typically represented by adding the negative particle না (na) to indefinite pronouns, which are themselves derived from their corresponding question words. Common indefinite pronouns are listed below.

Relative pronouns 
The relative pronoun যে (je) and its different variants, as shown below, are commonly employed in complex sentences. The relative pronouns for animate objects change for number and honor, but those for inanimate objects stay the same.

Nouns

Case
Nouns are also inflected for case, including nominative, accusative, genitive (possessive), and locative. The case marking pattern for each noun being inflected depends on the noun's degree of animacy. The accusative case cannot be inflected upon nouns which are inanimate, and the locative case cannot be inflected upon nouns which are animate. When a definite article such as -ţa (টা, for singular nouns) or -gulo (গুলো, for plural nouns) is added, nouns are also inflected for number. In formal contexts, especially in writing, the definite article -ţa is replaced by -ţi (টি). There is also an alternative way of using the plural definite article, -gulo, by making it -guli (গুলি). For animate nouns, -gulo/-guli are often replaced by -ra (রা) Below are two tables which show the inflections of an animate noun, ছাত্র chhatrô (student), and an inanimate noun, জুতা juta (shoe).

All of the inflected nouns above have an indefinite article preceding their case markers. There are some basic rules to keep in mind about the cases, apart from the "default" nominative.

For the accusative case, the ending -রে -re may be used in certain non-standard dialects of Bengali. For example, the non-standard ছাত্রটারে chhatrô-ţa-re may be used instead of the standard ছাত্রটাকে chhatrô-ţa-ke.

For the genitive case, the ending may change, though never with a definite article attached. A noun (without an article) which ends in a consonant or the inherent vowel, অ ô, is inflected by adding – ের -er to the end of the word (and deleting the inherent vowel if applicable). An example of this would be the genitive of মাংস mangshô "meat" being মাংসের  "of meat" or "(the) meat's". A noun which ends in any vowel apart from the inherent vowel will just have a -র -r following it, as in the genitive of ছেলে  being ছেলের  "(the) boy's". The genitive ending is also applied to verbs (in their verbal noun forms), which is most commonly seen when using postpositions (for example: শেখার জন্য shekhar jonno, "to/for learning").

For the locative case, the marker also changes in a similar fashion to the genitive case, with consonants and the inherent vowel having their own ending, – ে -e, and all other vowels having another ending, -তে -te, with one exception. If a noun ends with – া -a, then its locative case marker would be  -য় -y, as in কলকাতায় Kolkata-y "to Kolkata". However, this special exception for -a ending nouns is often ignored, and colloquially many will say কলকাতাতে Kolkata-te instead of the proper Kolktata-y.

Measure words
When counted, nouns must also be accompanied by the appropriate measure word. As in many East Asian languages (e.g. Chinese, Japanese, Thai, etc.), nouns in Bengali cannot be counted directly by adding the numeral directly adjacent to the noun. The noun's measure word (MW) must be used in between the numeral and the noun. Most nouns take the generic measure word ţa, although there are many more specific measure words, such as jon, which is only used to count humans.

Measuring nouns in Bengali without their corresponding measure words (e.g. aţ biŗal instead of aţ-ţa biŗal "eight cats") would typically be considered ungrammatical. However, omitting the noun and preserving the measure word is grammatical and not uncommon to hear. For example, Shudhu êk-jon thakbe. (lit. "Only one-MW will remain.") would be understood to mean "Only one person will remain.", since jon can only be used to count humans. The word lok "person" is implied.

Adjectives 
Adjectives do not inflect for case, gender, or number in Bengali and are placed before the noun they modify.

Some adjectives form their opposites by prefixing অ- (before consonants) or অন- (before vowels): for example, the opposite of সম্ভব (sômbhôb, "possible") is অসম্ভব (asômbhôb, "impossible").

Demonstrative adjectives – this and that – correspond to এই and ওই respectively, with the definite article attached to the following noun. Their plural forms (these/those) remain the same, with the plurality denoted by the definite article or the classifier. Thus, this book would translate to এই বইটি, while those books would translate to ওই বইগুলো.

Comparatives and superlatives 
Bengali adjectives form their comparative forms with আরও (aaro, "more"), and their superlative forms with সবচেয়ে (shôbcheye, "than all"). Comparisons are formed by using genitive form of the object of comparison, followed by the postposition চেয়ে (cheye, "than") or the postposition মতো (môto, "like") and then by আরও ("more") or কম (kôm, "less"). The word for "more" is optional, but the word for "less" is required, so in its absence "more" is inferred. Adjectives can be additionally modified by using অনেক (ônek, "much") or অনেক বেশি (ônek beshi, "much more"), which are especially useful for comparing quantities.

Verbs
Bengali verbs are highly inflected and are regular with only few exceptions. They consist of a stem and an ending; they are traditionally listed in Bengali dictionaries in their "verbal noun" form, which is usually formed by adding -a to the stem: for instance, করা (kôra, to do) is formed from the stem কর. The stem can end in either a vowel or a consonant. Verbs are conjugated for tense and person by changing the endings, which are largely the same for all verbs. However, the stem vowel can often change as part of the phenomenon known as "vowel harmony", whereby one vowel can be influenced by other vowels in the word to sound more harmonious. An example would be the verb "to write", with stem lekh-: লেখো (lekho, you all write) but also লিখি (likhi, we write). In general, the following transformations take place: ô → o, o → u, æ → e, e → i, and a → e (the latter only in the perfect tenses), where the verbal noun features the first vowel but certain conjugations use the second. In addition, the verbs দেওয়া (dêoa , to give) and নেওয়া (nêoa, to take) switch between e, i, a, and æ. If verbs are classified by stem vowel and if the stem ends in a consonant or vowel, there are nine basic classes in which most verbs can be placed; all verbs in a class will follow the same pattern. A prototype verb from each of these classes will be used to demonstrate conjugation for that class; bold will be used to indicate mutation of the stem vowel. Additionally, there are irregular verbs, such as যাওয়া (jaoa, to go) that change the first consonant in their stem in certain conjugations, or such as চাওয়া (chaoa, to want) that add an extra ই -i- to the stem in the future, present progressive, simple past, and past habitual.

Like many other Indo-Aryan languages (such as Hindi or Marathi), nouns can be turned into verbs by combining them with select auxiliary verbs. In Bengali, the most common such auxiliary verb is করা (kôra, to do); thus, verbs such as joke are formed by combining the noun form of joke (রসিকতা) with to do (করা) to create রসিকতা করা. When conjugating such verbs the noun part of such a verb is left untouched, so in the previous example, only করা would be inflected or conjugated (e.g.: "I will make a joke" becomes আমি রসিকতা করব; see more on tenses below). Other auxiliary verbs include দেওয়া and নেওয়া, but the verb করা enjoys significant usage because it can be combined with foreign verbs to form a native version of the verb, even if a direct translation exists. Most often this is done with English verbs: for example, "to vote" is often referred to as ভোট দেওয়া (bhot dæoa, where bhot is the transliteration of "vote").

Copula 
Bengali is considered a zero copula language in some aspects.

 In the simple present tense, there is no verb connecting the subject to the predicative (the "zero-verb" copula). There is one notable exception, however, which is when the predicative takes on the existential, locative, or possessive aspects; for such purposes, the incomplete verb আছ- (ach) is used, which is conjugated according to the rules given below. Whereas the verb হওয়া (howa) means "to be", the verb আছ- can be roughly translated as "to exist" or "to be present".
 In the past tense, the incomplete verb আছ- is always used as the copula, regardless of the nature of the predicative.
 For the future tense and non-finite structures, the copula is supplied by the verb হওয়া (howa), with the exceptions being the possessive and locative predicatives for which the verb থাকা (thaka, "to remain") is utilized.
 Possession: Bengali does not have a verb for possession (i.e. "to have", "to own"). Instead of the sentence "You have a book", possession in Bengali is expressed by the verb আছ- (for present and past tenses) and the verb থাকা (for future tense) inflected with the possessed object ("book") and a possessive (genitive) case for the possessor (i.e. তুমি → তোমার, you → your). For example: তোমার একটা বই আছে (Tōmāra ēkaṭā ba'i āchē, "You have a book"; Literally: "Your one book exists").

The following table demonstrates the rules above with some examples.

Negation 
There are four sentence negators employed in Bengali:

 The zero verb copula is negated using the incomplete negator ন-, which is conjugated as নই (1), নও (2F), নন (2P), নয় (3).
 Existential sentences that use the verb আছ- are negated with নেই (nei), which does not need to be conjugated.
 All other verbs (with the exceptions of the ones listed above) are negated using the universal negative particle না (na), which can also refer to "no" in yes-no questions. না is typically placed after the finite verb (see examples below), but can also be placed at the end of the sentence, which negates the whole sentence. না can be used in all tenses except two: the present perfect and the past perfect.
 Verbs in the present perfect and the past perfect tenses are negated using the suffix -নি (ni) attached to the simple present verb form; this naturally means that in negative sentences the distinction between the two tenses is lost, since they both use the same verb form.

Person
Verbs are inflected for person and honour, but not for number. There are five forms: first person, second person (very familiar), second person (familiar), third person (familiar), and second/third person (polite). The same sample subject pronouns will be used for all the example conjugation paradigms: ami, tui (তুই), tumi (তুমি), she (সে) and apni (আপনি). These have the following plurals respectively: amra (আমরা), tora (তোরা), tomra (তোমরা), tara (তারা) and apnara (আপনারা).

Mood
There are two moods for Bengali verbs: the indicative and the imperative. The indicative mood is used for statements of fact; its various tenses are given below.

The imperative mood is used to give commands. Just as in other Indo-Aryan languages, the imperative form of a verb differs on the basis of honorifics. The three sets of second-person pronouns – তুই/তোরা (2 (VF)), তুমি/তোমরা (2 (F)), আপনি/আপনারা (2/3 (P)) – combined with slight modifications to the stem of any verb form the imperatives for that verb; these are described in the table below. Bengali also has a 3rd person imperative, using the pronouns সে/তারা (3 (F)). Note that the plural command forms change the pronoun but not the verb ending. The 2nd person familiar and very familiar don't take stem transformations, while the others do.

Bangla also has a future imperative. In the second person familiar, this is formed by changing the vowel in the present imperative. In the second person very familiar, it's the same as the simple present form for that person. For the rest of the persons, the future imperative is the same as the future.

Non-finite forms
আঁকা ãka – verbal noun ("act of drawing")
আঁকতে ãkte – verbal infinitive ("to draw")
আঁকতে-আঁকতে ãkte-ãkte – progressive participle ("while drawing")
আঁকলে ãkle – conditional participle ("if X draws/ drew/ had drawn")
এঁকে ẽke – perfect participle ("having drawn")
এঁকে-এঁকে ẽke-ẽke – iterative participle ("having drawn many times")

For non-causative verbs (see more on causative verbs below), the verbal infinitive and perfect participle forms require stem transformations according to the principles of vowel harmony. Causative verbs only require stem transformations for forming their perfect participles.

The verbal noun can act like a regular noun, and can therefore take case-endings and classifier particles; additionally it can also function as an adjective. Both the verbal noun and the verbal infinitive are often used in constructions where the infinitive is needed.

The perfect participle can be combined with some verbs to denote a slight change in meaning for the first verb (as opposed to two verbs.) For example, (এটা) করে দাও (kore dao, 'do it (for us)'), করে নাও (kore nao, 'do it (for yourself)'), করে ফেল (kore phêlo, 'do it (with an emphasis on getting it done)'), etc. Many of these are similar to the light verbs used in other Indo-Aryan languages, though formed slightly differently.

Impersonal structures 
Many common sentence constructions, such as those involving obligation, need, and possibility ("I have to", "We must", "He is supposed to", etc.) are built in Bengali without using nominative subjects; instead, the subject is omitted, or often put into the genitive case. These are typically constructed using the verbal noun (or the verbal infinitive in some cases) along with other nouns or verbs.

 Obligation is expressed using the verbal infinitive and a third-person form of হওয়া (in any tense, but present tense also uses the future tense conjugation), with the subject in the objective case. For example: আমাকে খেতে হবে ("I have to eat"; হবে is the future tense conjugation for হওয়া).
 Need is expressed by using the verbal noun with the noun দরকার (dôrkar, need), and the subject in the genitive. For example: আমার কথা বলা দরকার ("I need to talk").
 Constructions involving "should", "ought to", or "must" are constructed with the verbal noun and the adjective উচিত (uchit, appropriate), and the subject in the genitive. For example: আমাদের যাওয়া উচিত ("We ought to go").

Passive 
Any active verb can be turned into a passive one by attaching the auxiliary হওয়া to the verbal noun aspect of the verb in question. Only this suffix is conjugated, using the third-person endings for the various tenses. For example: "to eat" is খাওয়া, so "to be eaten" becomes খাওয়া হওয়া; in the future tense, "will be eaten" would be খাওয়া হবে, where হবে is the third-person conjugation for হওয়া in the future tense (more information on tenses below).

Causative 
Most verbs (not all verbs have causative forms) can be made causative by adding the suffix -ন/নো to it. For example: "to do" is করা, which takes the -নো suffix to become করানো, or "to cause to do". The stem of such a causative verb – to be used when conjugating it – is thus the verbal noun form of the base verb (করা in the case of করানো). For the most part, such stems do not undergo any vowel transformations when conjugating for tenses. However, in the perfective participle (and thus, the perfect tenses), the -a at the end of the base gets removed, the -iye suffix is added, and the stem vowel changes, while the second person familiar future imperative is the same but with an -iyo and not an -iye.

Tense
Bengali has four simple tenses: the present tense, the past tense, the conditional or habitual past tense, and the future tense. These combine with mood and aspect to form more complex conjugations: the perfect tenses, for example, are formed by combining the perfect participles with the corresponding tense endings.

Aspect
There are three aspects for Bengali verbs: simple aspect, the progressive/continuous aspect, and the perfect. The progressive aspect is denoted by adding prefix the regular tense endings with ছ (for stems ending with consonants) or চ্ছ (for stems ending with vowels), while the perfect aspect requires the use of the perfect participle. These are combined with the different tenses described below to form the various verbal conjugations possible.

Simple present tense
The present tense in Bengali is similar to that of English: I eat, you run, he reads.

Present progressive tense 
The present progressive tense in also similar to that of English: I am eating, you are running, he is reading, etc. This tense is formed by combining the progressive aspect suffix (ছ/চ্ছ) with the present tense endings; we thus get -chhi, -chhish, -chho, -chhe and -chhen, and all forms require stem transformations for vowel harmony.

Present perfect tense 
The present perfect tense is used to relate events that happened fairly recently, or even past events whose effects are still felt in the present. It is formed by adding the present progressive tense suffixes (see above) with the perfect participle of the verb.

Simple past tense
The (simple) past tense differs from its use in English in that it is usually reserved for events that have occurred recently; for instance, less than a day ago. It would be translated into the English simple past tense: I ate, you ran, he read. The endings are -lam, -li, -le, -lo, -len (notice that the vowels for the second and third [familiar] persons are the reverse of those in the present tense), and all forms require stem transformations for vowel harmony. In non-rarhi varieties of Bengali, that is to say northern and eastern dialects, "a" is substituted for "e" in second-person familiar forms; thus tumi bolla, khulla, khella etc. which is the original inflection, the “e” in contrast is a vowel-harmonised variant of the former, having gone through a process called abhisruti.

 Past progressive tense 
The past progressive tense is similar to that of English: I was eating, you were running, he was reading, etc. This tense is formed by combining the progressive aspect suffix (ছ/চ্ছ) with the past tense endings, but with an extra -i- inserted in between; we thus get -chhilam, -chhili, -chhile, -chhilo and -chhilen, and all forms require stem transformations for vowel harmony.

 Past perfect tense 
The past perfect tense differs from its usage in English. It's usually used for events that didn't happen recently; over a day ago, for instance, unlike Bangla's simple past (see above). It would usually be translated with English's simple past: I ate, you ran, he read, etc. but it can also be translated with English's past perfect tense: I had eaten, you had run, he had read, etc. It's formed by adding the past progressive tense suffixes (see above) to the perfect participle of the verb.

Habitual past tense
The habitual past tense has a few different uses. It is used for events that happened regularly, such as "I used to eat out every day" or "He wrote poems when he was young", the equivalent of an imperfect. It may also be used as a sort of conditional, such as the following: "If you asked I would come" or "If you had asked I would have come" (তুমি যদি বলতে আমি আসতাম tumi jodi bolte ami ashtam). It is easy to form the habitual past tense: simply start with the simple past tense and change the l to t (except in the tui [2 VF] form). The endings are -tam, -tish, -te, -to, -ten, and all forms require stem transformations for vowel harmony. In less standard varieties of Bengali, "a" is substituted for "e" in second-person familiar forms; thus  etc.

 Future tense 

In less standard varieties of Bengali, "a" is substituted for "e" in second-person familiar forms; thus  etc. The endings are -bo, -bi, -be, -be, -ben; the তুমি and সে conjugations are identical in this tense. Forms ending in a consonant do require stem transformations for vowel harmony, but ones ending in a vowel don't.

Prepositions and postpositions
Whereas English features prepositions, Bengali typically uses postpositions. That is, while these modifying words occur before their object in English (beside him, inside the house), they typically occur after their object in Bengali (or pashe, baŗir bhitore). Some postpositions require their object noun to take the possessive case, while others require the objective case (which is unmarked for inanimate nouns); this distinction must be memorised. Most postpositions are formed by taking nouns referring to a location and inflecting them for the locative case. They can also be applied to verbal nouns.

Postpositions that require genitive (possessive) case
 আগে aage  'before': সকালের আগে shôkal-er age 'before the morning'
 পরে pôre 'after': সন্ধ্যার পরে shondha-r pôre 'after the evening'
 উপরে upore 'on top of', 'above': বিছানার উপরে bichhana-r upore 'on top of the bed'
 নিচে niche 'below', 'under': বইয়ের নিচে boi-er niche 'under the book'
 পিছনে pichhone 'behind': আলমারির পিছনে almari-r pichhone 'behind the cupboard'
 সামনে  'in front of': গাড়ির সামনে  'in front of the car'
 ওই পারে oi pare 'across': নদীর ওই পারে nodi-r oi pare 'across the river'
 কাছে  'near': জানালার কাছে janala-r  'near the window'
 পাশে pashe 'beside': চুলার পাশে chula-r pashe 'beside the stove'
 জন্য jonno 'for': শিক্ষকের জন্য shikkhôk-er jonno 'for the teacher'
 কাছ থেকে kachh theke 'from' (people): বাবার কাছ থেকে baba-r kachh theke 'from father'
 দিকে dike 'towards': বাসার দিকে basha-r dike 'towards the house'
 বাইরে baire 'outside': দেশের বাইরে desh-er baire 'outside the country'
 ভিতরে bhitore 'inside': দোকানের ভিতরে dokan-er bhitore 'inside the store'
 মধ্যে  'in the middle of': সমুদ্রের মধ্যে  'in the middle of the ocean'
 ভিতর দিয়ে bhitor die 'through': শহরের ভিতর দিয়ে shôhorer bhitor die 'through the city'
 মতো môto 'like': তোমার মতো tom-ar môto 'like you'
 সঙ্গে shôngge 'with': আমার সঙ্গে am-ar shôngge 'with me'
 কথা kôtha 'about': সেটার কথা sheţa-r kôtha 'about that'
 সম্মন্ধে shômmondhe 'about': ইতিহাসের সম্মন্ধে itihash-er shômmondhe 'about history'
 সাথে  'with'(animate): মায়ের সাথে ma-er ' 'with Mother'

Postpositions that require accusative (objective) case
 করে kore 'by means of': ট্যাক্সিকরে ţêksi kore 'by taxi'
 ছাড়া chhaŗa 'without', 'aside from': আমাকে ছাড়া ama-ke chhaŗa 'aside from me'
 থেকে theke 'from' (places): বাংলাদেশ থেকে Bangladesh theke 'from Bangladesh'
 দিয়ে diye 'by': তাকে দিয়ে ta-ke diye 'by him'
 নিয়ে niye 'about' (animate), 'with' (animate): তোমাকে নিয়ে toma-ke niye 'about/with you'
 পর্যন্ত porjonto 'until': দশটা পর্যন্ত dôshţa porjonto 'until ten o' clock'
 সহ shôho 'with', 'including': টাকা সহ ţaka shôho 'along with the money'
 হয়ে hoe 'via': কলকাতা হয়ে Kolkata hoe 'via Kolkata'

 Postpositions that require nominative case 

 ধরে dhore 'for' (time): দুদিন ধরে dudin dhore 'for two days'
 নিয়ে niye 'about' (inanimate), 'with' (inanimate):  'তা নিয়ে' ta niye 'about/with it'

Prepositions that require locative case
 বিনা bina 'without': বিনা অনুমতিতে bina onumoti-te 'without permission'

References

Chatterji, Suniti Kumar. Bengali Self-Taught. Calcutta: Rupa & Co., 1991.
Radice, William. Teach Yourself Bengali. Chicago: NTC Publishing Group, 1994.
Bonazzi, Eros. Grammatica Bengali. Bologna (Italy): Libreria Bonomo Editrice, 2008. 

Further reading
 Thompson, Hanne-Ruth (2012). Bengali''. Volume 18 of London Oriental and African Language Library. John Benjamins Publishing. .

MW:measure word

 
Grammar
Languages of Bangladesh
Languages of India
Indo-Aryan grammars